was a feudal domain under the Tokugawa shogunate of Edo period Japan, in Harima Province in what is now the southwestern portion of modern-day Hyōgo Prefecture. It was centered around the Mikazuki jin'ya which was located in what is now the Mikazuki neighborhood of the town of Sayō, Hyōgo. It was controlled by a cadet branch tozama daimyō Mori clan throughout its history. It was also called .

History
In April 1676, the 2nd daimyō of Tsuyama Domain, Mori Nagatsugu, gave 15,000 koku of this holdings to his fifth son, Mori Nagatoshi, to create a cadet house. However, this subsidiary domain, Tsuyama Shinden Domain, did not receive official recognition from the shogunate until 1684. In 1697, the Mori clan were disposed from Tsuyama; but Tsuyama Shinden Domain was allowed to remain at its existing 15,000 koku as an independent domain called Mikazuki Domain. It survived nine generations, or 174 years, until the Meiji restoration. The 5th daimyō Mori Hayaatsu opened the han school, "Kōgyōkan". During the Boshin War, the domain quickly sided with the imperial government. In 1871, with the abolition of the han system, the domain became "Mikazuki Prefecture", which was merged with "Shikama Prefecture", which in turn became part of Hyōgo Prefecture.

The clan was ennobled with the kazoku peerage title of shishaku (viscount) in 1884.

Holdings at the end of the Edo period
As with most domains in the han system, Mikazuki Domain consisted of several discontinuous territories calculated to provide the assigned kokudaka, based on periodic cadastral surveys and projected agricultural yields. 

Harima Province 
7 villages in Issai District
40 villages in Sayo District
18 villages in Shisō District

List of daimyō 

{| class=wikitable
! #||Name || Tenure || Courtesy title || Court Rank || kokudaka 
|-
|colspan=6|  Mori clan, 1697-1871 (Tozama)
|-
||1||||1697 - 1715||Tsushima-no-kami (対馬守)||Junior 5th Rank, Lower Grade (従五位下)||15,000 koku
|-
||2||||1715 - 1739||Aki-no-kami (安芸守)|| Junior 5th Rank, Lower Grade (従五位下)||15,000 koku
|-
||3||||1739 - 1774||Aki-no-kami (安芸守)|| Junior 5th Rank, Lower Grade (従五位下)||15,000 koku
|-
||4||||1774 - 1793||Kawachi-no-kami (河内守)|| Junior 5th Rank, Lower Grade (従五位下)||15,000 koku
|-
||5||||1793 - 1801|| Shimotsuke-no-kami (下野守)|| Junior 5th Rank, Lower Grade (従五位下)||15,000 koku
|-
||6||||1801 - 1809||Kawachi-no-kami (河内守)|| Junior 5th Rank, Lower Grade (従五位下)||15,000 koku
|-
||7||||1809 - 1816||Tsushima-no-kami (対馬守)||Junior 5th Rank, Lower Grade (従五位下)||15,000 koku
|-
|8||||1816 - 1848||Sado-no-kami (佐渡守)|| Junior 5th Rank, Lower Grade (従五位下)||15,000 koku
|-
|9||||1848 - 1871||Tsushima-no-kami (対馬守)||Junior 5th Rank, Lower Grade (従五位下)||15,000 koku
|-
|}

See also 
 List of Han
 Abolition of the han system

Further reading
 Bolitho, Harold. (1974). Treasures Among Men: The Fudai Daimyo in Tokugawa Japan. New Haven: Yale University Press.  ;  OCLC 185685588

References

Domains of Japan
1871 disestablishments in Japan
States and territories disestablished in 1871
Harima Province
History of Hyōgo Prefecture